John Lehane (1884 - 18 August 1938) was an Irish Gaelic footballer who played as a forward for the Cork senior team.

Kelleher made his first appearance for the team during the 1907 championship and was a regular member of the starting fifteen for a number of seasons. During that time he won one All-Ireland medal and two Munster medals.

At club level Lehane was a multiple county championship medalist with Macroom.

References

1884 births
1938 deaths
Macroom Gaelic footballers
Cork inter-county Gaelic footballers
Winners of one All-Ireland medal (Gaelic football)